The Chilton Chine is a geological feature on the south west coast of the Isle of Wight, England. It lies to the west of the village of Brighstone.  It is a small coastal gully, one of a number of such chines on the island created by stream erosion of soft Cretaceous rocks.

Overview
It runs from the hamlet of Chilton Green down to the A3055 Military Road where it passes under the road and continues for about 200m to the beach at Brighstone Bay. The sides of the gully are fairly shallow and allow the growth of hardy bushes, scrub and rough grasses.

The Chine drains water off the mainly flat agricultural land that surrounds Chilton Green. Important fossils have been found in the chine.

To the east of the Chilton Chine is the Isle of Wight Pearl Centre, a tourist attraction which overlooks the chine.

The Isle of Wight Coastal Path follows the top of the chine from the cliff edge to the carpark next to the A3055.

External links
 Useful info on chines of West Wight

Chines of the Isle of Wight